Outback Wildlife Rescue is an observational documentary series that features animal rescue set against the Australian outback.  The cast includes wildlife vets, animal carers, a crocodile, and management team.

The series is produced by Freehand Productions for broadcast on the Seven Network in 2008.  BBC Worldwide distribute the series internationally.

References

External links
Official Site
Freehand Productions
Australia Zoo Wildlife Warriors Worldwide
The Ark Animal Hospital, Darwin
Wildcare, Alice Springs
 

2008 Australian television series debuts
Television shows set in the Northern Territory
Australian factual television series
Television series by Freehand Productions
Australian outback